Sexcetera is an American television series airing on Playboy TV. Formatted as a newsmagazine, the program focused on human sexuality.

Sexcetera is repeated from time to time on Real Lives, Pick and Virgin1 in the United Kingdom, RTL 7 in the Netherlands, TV5 in Finland and AXN in Italy.

Launched in 1998, Sexcetera ran for more than 80 episodes. By the time the program went off the air in 2005, it had become one of Playboy TV's longest-running shows.

The show featured four to five reports per one-hour episode. Filmed throughout the world, but primarily in the United States, the reports generally covered sexual fetishes, adult entertainment expos and gatherings, current erotic trends, sex toys, porn celebrities and tips for couples.

Correspondents presented their stories in a humorous style; female correspondents often appeared in the nude. As befitting its subject matter, the series is sexually explicit, with unsimulated sexual activity shown from time to time, with increasing explicitness as the series went on.

Reporters
 Valerie Baber
 Kara Blanc
 Susannah Breslin
 Hoyt Christopher
 Ralph Garman
 Frank Gianotti
 Lauren Hays
 Asante Jones
 Andrea Lowell
 Gretchen Massey
 Sam Phillips
 Scott Potasnik
 Kira Reed

References

External links
 

1998 American television series debuts
2005 American television series endings
Erotic television series
Nudity in television
Television series by Playboy Enterprises
Playboy TV original programming